Chaudhry Abdus Salam (or Chaudhry Abdul Salam) is former Chairman executive of Punjab Bar Council. He was elected unopposed to this post. He was elected member of bar council from Faisalabad.

References

Living people
Year of birth missing (living people)
Place of birth missing (living people)
Chairmen of the Punjab Bar Council